Henry High School can refer to one of the following high schools:
 Henry-Senachwine High School, public high school in Henry, Illinois

Also see:
 Patrick Henry High School (disambiguation), multiple schools